Elias Græsbøll Munk-Petersen (born 21 May 1992) is a Danish actor. He is also a writer, who wrote his first novel The Stupidity of Youth at the age of 17 and a lot of short-stories. Elias was selected as Northern Light Talent at the Berlinale Filmfestival 2015. His career in Denmark kicked off with a lead role in the feature film For My Brother by Brian Bang. This led to a lead role in the short fiction story Exit Neverland by Chadi Abdul-Karim. That story was nominated for a Robert Award and won the European Independent Filmfestival for best short story. In 2014 Elias played lead in the short story When the Sun Shines that won Guldægget Award for best short story and Elias won the Guldægget Award for best actor. The success of the short movie led to the making of the feature film that premiered in Denmark at the CPH PIX filmfestival October 2016. Same year, at the Subtitle Film Festival, Elias won a shared award for Outstanding Performance with Laura Kjær for their roles in When The Sun Shines.

Filmography

Actor

Director 
 2014: Kadie Elder First Time He Kissed a Boy (Short movie)
 2015: Go Go Berlin: Electric Lives (Short movie)

References

External links 
 
 Team Players

1992 births
Living people
Danish male film actors
21st-century Danish male actors